Ashish Yadav is an Indian politician and a member of the Sixteenth Legislative Assembly of Uttar Pradesh in India. He represents the Shekhupur constituency of Uttar Pradesh and is a member of the Samajwadi Party political party until 2017.

Early life and  education
Ashish Yadav was born in Bhadoi district . He attended the UP  Madhyamik Shiksha Parishad and is educated till twelfth grade.

Political career
Ashish Yadav has been a MLA for two terms. He represented the Shekhupur constituency and was a member of the Samajwadi Party political party until 21 January 2017, when he left the party to contest in the upcoming Assembly election.

Posts held

See also
 Shekhupur (Assembly constituency)
 Sixteenth Legislative Assembly of Uttar Pradesh
 Uttar Pradesh Legislative Assembly

References 

Samajwadi Party politicians
Uttar Pradesh MLAs 2002–2007
Uttar Pradesh MLAs 2012–2017
People from Budaun district
1972 births
Living people